Remixes is a compilation album by Headlights released on December 9, 2008.

Track listing
 "Cherry Tulips" (TJ Lipple) - 3:37
 "Owl Eyes" (The Buddy System) - 2:46
 "Market Girl" (The Album Leaf) - 3:45
 "School Boys" (Cale Parks) - 3:57
 "Towers" (Uzi and Ari) - 4:08
 "Everybody Needs a Fence to Lean On" (Via Satellite) - 3:06
 "So Much For the Afternoon" (Casiotone for the Painfully Alone) - 4:06
 "TV" (Son Lux) - 3:42
 "Put Us Back Together Right" (Ruby Isle) - 3:19
 "On April 2" (Jason Caddell) - 2:30
 "Your Old Street" (Spinnerty) - 4:49
 "Get Yer Head Around It" (This Show is the Rainbow) - 2:48
 "Tokyo" (Brett Sanderson) - 3:51

2008 remix albums
Headlights (band) albums
Polyvinyl Record Co. remix albums